Molly Sullivan Sliney (born August 13, 1966) is a former American foil fencer, now working as a motivational speaker and fencing instructor.

Sliney was a member of the 1988 and 1992 United States Olympic fencing teams. She also won two gold medals in the 1987 and 1991 Pan American Games. While fencing for the University of Notre Dame, she was the NCAA Women's Foil Individual Champion in 1986 and 1988.  At the time she was listed in the Guinness Book of World Records for winning two individual NCAA titles. Sliney also was U.S. National Champion in 1985.  In 1987, she led the Notre Dame Women's Foil Team to an NCAA championship by posting a 10-0 record in the tournament.  This was the first time the Fighting Irish had ever won an NCAA Women's title in any sport. She graduated with a 160-14 record, and Notre Dame named her 1980s Female Athlete of the Decade.

Since retiring from competition in 1992, Sliney has been an active motivational speaker and fencing instructor. She primarily speaks to students, sharing her many experiences, including her experience with the learning disability dyslexia. Her presentations focus on the importance of reading, goal-setting and improving self-esteem.

In July, 2017, Sliney was inducted into the United States Fencing Hall of Fame.

In September, 2017, Sliney started Vivo Fencing Club along with Arpad Horvath 
in Bradford, Massachusetts as a partner and fencing coach. They later moved to Haverhill, Massachusetts.

References

External links 
 Molly's Official Site - Sliney.com
 Vivo Fencing Club 
 Olympic fencer Molly Sliney shares story of struggle and triumph 
 Olympic Fencer show students how to conquer negative thinking 
 Topsfield Steward School hosts Olympic fencer

1966 births
American female foil fencers
Fencers at the 1988 Summer Olympics
Fencers at the 1992 Summer Olympics
Living people
American motivational speakers
Notre Dame Fighting Irish fencers
Olympic fencers of the United States
People from Methuen, Massachusetts
Women motivational speakers
Pan American Games gold medalists for the United States
Pan American Games medalists in fencing
People from Bradford, Massachusetts
Fencers at the 1987 Pan American Games
Fencers at the 1991 Pan American Games
21st-century American women
Medalists at the 1987 Pan American Games
Medalists at the 1991 Pan American Games